Ayub Kalantari (born 1990) is an Iranian footballer, who plays for Nassaji in the Persian Gulf Pro League.

Club career
Kalantari joined Foolad in summer 2012, after spending previous two season in Fajr Sepasi.

After one season with Saba Qom, he joined newly promoted side Siah Jamegan in the summer of 2015.

Statistics

Honours
Foolad
Iran Pro League (1): 2013–14

External links
 Ayub Kalantari at Persianleague.com
 https://www.youtube.com/watch?v=ydACiq1Y_Ks

1990 births
Living people
Iranian footballers
Foolad FC players
Fajr Sepasi players
Tractor S.C. players
Saipa F.C. players
Esteghlal Khuzestan F.C. players
Persian Gulf Pro League players
Association football midfielders
People from Shiraz
Sportspeople from Fars province